Besposhchadny was one of 29 s (officially known as Project 7) built for the Soviet Navy during the late 1930s. Completed in 1939, she was assigned to the Black Sea Fleet. After the start of the German invasion of the Soviet Union (Operation Barbarossa) in June 1941, the ship helped to lay minefields off Sevastopol. During the Siege of Odessa the ship transported troops and supplies while providing naval gunfire support to the defenders until she was crippled by German dive bombers in September. Besposhchadny was further damaged by bombs while still under repair in November and they were not completed for almost another year.

The ship ferried troops and supplies for the rest of the year and then provided fire support during an amphibious landing behind German lines in the Caucasus in February 1943. She later bombarded Axis positions and unsuccessfully attempted to intercept German convoys off the Crimea. After a one such attempt, Besposhchadny and two other destroyers were attacked by German aircraft in October. After repeated attacks, she was sunk with only 41 survivors.

Design and description
Having decided to build the large and expensive   destroyer leaders, the Soviet Navy sought Italian assistance in designing smaller and cheaper destroyers.

Their crew numbered 197 officers and sailors in peacetime and 236 in wartime. The designers had been conservative in rating the turbines and many, but not all, of the ships handily exceeded their designed speed during their sea trials.

As built, the Gnevny-class ships mounted four  B-13 guns in two pairs of superfiring single mounts fore and aft of the superstructure. Anti-aircraft defense was provided by a pair of  34-K AA guns in single mounts and a pair of  21-K AA guns as well as two  DK or DShK machine guns. They carried six  torpedo tubes in two rotating triple mounts; each tube was provided with a reload. The ships could also carry a maximum of either 60 or 95 mines and 25 depth charges. The ships were equipped with two K-1 paravanes intended to destroy mines and a pair of depth-charge throwers.

Construction and service 
Built in Nikolayev's Shipyard No. 198 (Andre Marti (South)) as yard number 322, Besposhchadny was laid down on 15 May 1936. The ship was completed on 22 August 1939 and was commissioned into the Black Sea Fleet on 2 October 1939. When the Germans invaded the Soviet Union on 22 June 1941, the ship was assigned to the 2nd Destroyer Division of the Black Sea Fleet. On 23–25 June Besposhchadny laid 114 defensive mines off Sevastopol. On 9 July, the 2nd Destroyer Division, including the destroyer leader , Besposhchadny and her sister ships ,  and  made an unsuccessful attempt to interdict Axis shipping near Fidonisi. Besposhchadny ran aground near the Eupatoria lighthouse on 14 July and damaged her propellers. After repairs, she began escorting cargo ships to Odessa while also transporting supplies and troops there. In addition, the ship provided gunfire support. On 14–17 August, Besposhchadny escorted the incomplete ships being evacuated from the shipyards at Nikolayev. The destroyer helped to escort transports ferrying the 157th Rifle Division to Odessa on 16–21 September.  While providing fire support during the amphibious landing at Grigorievka on 22 September, Besposhchadny was attacked by Junkers Ju 87 Stuka dive bombers of StG 77. They nearly blew her bow off and she steamed to Odessa for emergency repairs. The following day, she was towed, stern-first, to Sevastopol by the destroyer . The ship was repaired using the salvaged bow from her sunken sister . While still under repair, Besposhchadny was attacked by Stukas from StG 77 on 12 November; they hit her once in the aft boiler room and near missed her several times. The bombs badly damaged her propulsion machinery and started a large fire. She was drydocked for emergency repairs on the 14th and was towed to Poti, Georgia three days later by the destroyer  for further repairs that lasted until September 1942.

While still under repair, Besposhchadny was awarded the Order of the Red Banner on 4 April. The ship completed her post-repair sea trials and working up by 9 October and helped to ferry the 8th, 9th and 10th Guards Rifle Brigades and other troops from Poti to Tuapse on 19–28 October. On 29 November, Besposhchadny and Boyky were tasked to attack Axis shipping off the Bulgarian coast and to bombard the port of Mangalia, Romania. They failed to locate any ships and mistook coastal rocks for a convoy in heavy fog on 1 December, firing 141 shells from their main guns and six torpedoes at them. Besposhchadny, together with the light cruiser  and the destroyer , transported the 9th Mountain Rifle Division and other troops from Batumi, Georgia, to Tuapse in early December. Together with Soobrazitelny, Besposhchadny covered the sortie of a division of minesweepers off the Romanian coast and then unsuccessfully patrolled south of Fidonisi themselves on 26–29 December.

The destroyer bombarded German positions around Novorossiysk on 1 February 1943 with 206 shells from her 130 mm guns. On 4 February, she provided fire support during the amphibious landing west of  Novorossiysk, firing 151 illumination and 56 high-explosive shells. Besposhchadny fired 105 shells at Axis troops near Anapa on 13 February. During the rest of the month, the ship helped to ferry 8,037 troops from Tuapse to Gelendzhik. On the night of 30 April/1 May, Boyky and Besposhchadny shelled Axis positions on the Kerch Peninsula and then the ship bombarded Alushta on the night of 20/21 May. Boyky and Besposhchadny, together with the destroyer  made an unsuccessful attempt on 30 September to intercept German transports evacuating troops and equipment from the Kuban Bridgehead. During the night of 5/6 October, Kharkov, Besposhchadny and Sposobny attempted to intercept German evacuation convoys off the Crimean coast, but were again unsuccessful. Kharkov bombarded Yalta and Alushta while the two smaller destroyers steamed to do the same to Feodosia. The latter pair were attacked by five S-boats of the 1st S-Boat Flotilla en route. The Germans failed to damage either destroyer and Sposobny claimed one hit on S-45. On their way home the three ships were spotted by German reconnaissance aircraft and were attacked by Stukas of III./StG 3. Kharkov was damaged by their first attack and had to be towed by Sposobny. The second attack damaged all three ships and Sposobny alternated towing Besposhchadny and Kharkov. The next attack sank both Kharkov and Besposhchadny with only 41 crewmen rescued from the latter. This incident prompted Stalin to issue an order forbidding the use of ships destroyer-sized and larger without his express permission.

Citations

Sources

Further reading
 

Gnevny-class destroyers
1936 ships
Ships built at the Black Sea Shipyard
Destroyers sunk by aircraft
Ships sunk by German aircraft
Maritime incidents in October 1943
World War II shipwrecks in the Black Sea